Yerosovo is a rural locality (a village) in Vorshinskoye Rural Settlement, Sobinsky District, Vladimir Oblast, Russia. The population was 22 as of 2010.

Geography 
Yerosovo is located on the Koloksha River, 28 km northeast of Sobinka (the district's administrative centre) by road. Astafyevo is the nearest rural locality.

References 

Rural localities in Sobinsky District
Vladimirsky Uyezd